KGC may refer to:

 Korea Ginseng Corporation, Seoul
 Kahnawake Gaming Commission, Quebec, Canada
 Knights of the Golden Circle, southern US secret society 1854-1864
 KGC (band)
 IATA code for Kingscote Airport